Thirteen species of amphibians and forty-seven species of reptiles are native to the U.S. state of Nebraska. This list only includes native species.

Frogs and toads 
Eleven species from five families, (Bufonidae, Hylidae, Microhylidae, Pelobatidae, and Ranidae), of frogs and toads are native to Nebraska.

 American bullfrog
 American toad 
 Cope's gray tree frog
 Great Plains narrow-mouthed toad
 Great Plains toad
 Northern cricket frog
 Northern leopard frog
 Plains leopard frog
 Plains spadefoot toad
 Western chorus frog
 Woodhouse's toad

Lizards 
Ten species of lizards are native to Nebraska.

 Six-lined racerunner
 Five-lined skink
 Many-lined skink
 Great Plains skink
 Prairie skink
 Lesser earless lizard
 Slender glass lizard
 Pygmy short-horned lizard
 Sagebrush lizard
 Eastern fence lizard

Salamanders 
Two species of salamanders, both from family Ambystomidae, are native to Nebraska.

 Small-mouth salamander 
 Tiger salamander

Snakes 
Twenty-five species of non-venomous snakes (Colubridae) and four species of venomous snakes (Viperidae) are native to Nebraska.

Non-venomous 

 Black rat snake
 Bullsnake
 Coachwhip snake
 Common garter snake
 Common water snake
 Dekay's brownsnake
 Eastern hog-nosed snake
 Fox snake
 Glossy snake
 Graham's crayfish snake 
 Great Plains ratsnake
 Lined snake
 North American racer
 Plains black-headed snake
 Plains garter snake
 Plains hog-nosed snake
 Prairie kingsnake
 Red-bellied snake
 Ring-necked snake
 Smooth green snake
 Speckled kingsnake
 Western milk snake
 Western ribbon snake
 Western terrestrial garter snake
 Western worm snake

Venomous 

 Eastern copperhead
 Massasauga
 Prairie rattlesnake
 Timber rattlesnake

Turtles 
Eight species of turtles from four families, (Chelydridae, Emydidae, Kinosternidae, and Trionychidae), are native to Nebraska.

 Blanding's turtle
 Common snapping turtle
 False map turtle
 Ornate box turtle
 Painted turtle
 Smooth softshell turtle 
 Spiny softshell turtle
 Yellow mud turtle

References 

Fauna of Nebraska
Nebraska
Nebraska
amphibians and reptiles